Soher El Sukaria (born 16 May 1975) is a Lebanese-born Argentine politician, who is currently a member of the Argentine Chamber of Deputies elected in Córdoba Province since 2019. A member of Republican Proposal, El Sukaria previously served as a member of the Córdoba Provincial Legislature from 2015 to 2019.

A practicing Muslim, El Sukaria is the first Muslim woman elected to the Argentine Congress.

Early life and education
El Sukaria was born on 16 May 1975 in Jdeide, a small village in northeastern Lebanon. Her mother, Rosa, is Argentine of Arab descent, while her father, Mounif, was a prominent Sunni imam in Córdoba until his death in 2002. Her parents met during a trip to Lebanon and married there; Soher was born shortly thereafter. The family moved back to Argentina when Soher was a month old, settling in Córdoba.

El Sukaria studied law at the National University of Córdoba and attained a master's degree on International Relations from the same university. She also has a master's degree on International Relations from the International University of Andalusia.

Political career
At the 2015 general election, El Sukaria was a candidate in the Juntos por Córdoba list to the Córdoba Provincial Legislature; she was elected. She was later appointed president of the City of Córdoba chapter of the Republican Proposal.

El Sukaria was the second candidate in the Córdoba Province Juntos por el Cambio list to the Argentine Chamber of Deputies in the 2019 general election, behind Mario Negri; the list was the most voted in the province, and El Sukaria was elected. Upon being elected, El Sukaria became the first Muslim woman elected to the National Congress of Argentina – a number of Muslim men, most prominently Eduardo Menem, had previously served in both houses of Congress before.

Electoral history

References

External links

Profile on the official website of the Chamber of Deputies (in Spanish)

1975 births
Living people
People from Baalbek District
People from Córdoba, Argentina
Argentine people of Lebanese descent
Lebanese emigrants to Argentina
Argentine Muslims
21st-century Argentine politicians
21st-century Argentine women politicians
Members of the Argentine Chamber of Deputies elected in Córdoba
Women members of the Argentine Chamber of Deputies
Members of the Legislature of Córdoba
Republican Proposal politicians
National University of Córdoba alumni